The World Group Play-offs were four ties which involves the losing nations of the World Group first round and the winning nations of the World Group II. Nations that win their play-off ties entered the 2018 World Group, while losing nations joined the 2018 World Group II.

France vs. Spain

Russia vs. Belgium

Germany vs. Ukraine

Slovakia vs. Netherlands

References 

World Group Play-offs